The McCarthys is an American sitcom television series created by Brian Gallivan, who also shares executive producer credits with Mike Sikowitz, Will Gluck, Richard Schwartz, and Andy Ackerman for CBS Television Studios and Sony Pictures Television. The series debuted on CBS during the 2014–15 television season, airing Thursdays at 9:30 pm (ET/PT)/8:30 pm (CT). It aired from October 30, 2014, to July 11, 2015.

On February 3, 2015, CBS pulled The McCarthys from the schedule after 11 episodes, with 4 unaired episodes left.

On May 8, 2015, CBS officially canceled the series after only one season. On June 12, 2015, it was announced that the remaining episodes would burn off on Saturday evenings, with two episodes per night beginning July 4, 2015. The series concluded on July 11, 2015, after one season and 15 episodes.

The entire series was released on DVD on March 16, 2017.

Premise
The series revolves around the McCarthys, a close-knit working class Boston clan whose sports legacy runs deep. When outspoken father Arthur, a dedicated basketball coach for the fictional Cardinal Hennigan High School, decides to take his athletically challenged — and openly gay — son Ronny under his wing as his new assistant, the other siblings (who are more passionate about sports) start crying foul over their dad's choice.

Cast

Main
 Tyler Ritter as Ronny McCarthy, a 29-year-old openly gay man and guidance counselor who must choose between a great opportunity to move to Rhode Island and an offer to work under his father as an assistant high school basketball coach
 Laurie Metcalf as Marjorie McCarthy, a mother of four children. Her favorite is Ronny, with whom she watches The Good Wife.
 Jack McGee as Arthur McCarthy, Marjorie's husband and father of four. He is the head basketball coach at a Catholic high school and wants to hire Ronny as his assistant.
 Jimmy Dunn as Sean McCarthy, Arthur and Marjorie's son and the fraternal twin brother of Gerard
 Joey McIntyre as Gerard McCarthy, Arthur and Marjorie's son and the fraternal twin brother of Sean
 Kelen Coleman as Jackie McCarthy, Arthur and Marjorie's only daughter, who is single and pregnant

Recurring
 Jessica St. Clair as Katrina, Gerard's annoying on-off girlfriend (later fiancée) whom Marjorie completely dislikes
 Kenny Ridwan as Jared

Notable guest stars
 Alyson Hannigan as Pam, Arthur & Marjorie's neighbor who rents their third floor
 John Ratzenberger as Charlie Ellis, the athletic director at the high school where Arthur works
 Jane Kaczmarek as Eileen, Marjorie's sister
 Brent Morin as Tommy, Jackie's former high school fling who comes out as gay
 Rick Fox as himself
 Jean Smart as Lydia, Katrina's mother
 David Alan Grier as Dr. Hugh Morris, Ronny's therapist

Episodes

Production
Jacki Weaver was set to play Marjorie, but later dropped out due to her work on Gracepoint and Patrick Stewart's Starz comedy Blunt Talk. On December 1, 2014, CBS increased the series' first season order from 13 to 15 episodes.

Reception
The pilot of The McCarthys has received mixed reviews from critics. On Rotten Tomatoes, the show holds a rating of 57%, based on 40 reviews, with an average rating of 5.3/10. The site's consensus reads, "The McCarthys is a semi-successful attempt at a throwback sitcom with above-par performances, but its broad stereotypes and lack of a unique point of view also make it semi-forgettable." On Metacritic, the show has a score of 53 out of 100, based on 22 critics, indicating "mixed or average reviews".

Syndication
Despite its cancellation, the series still has syndicated reruns on various networks, such as Universal HD. This has been supported by high syndication ratings.

References

External links
 
 
 Origin of the photo of the twins when they were little featured in the first episode which remained visible during the series in the background on a table near the front door of the family home

2010s American sitcoms
2014 American television series debuts
2015 American television series endings
American LGBT-related sitcoms
American sports television series
English-language television shows
CBS original programming
Gay-related television shows
Television series by CBS Studios
Television series by Sony Pictures Television
Television shows set in Boston
2010s American LGBT-related comedy television series